The Minnesota–Wisconsin ice hockey rivalry is an intercollegiate ice hockey rivalry between the Minnesota Golden Gophers and Wisconsin Badgers. An extension of the broader rivalry between the two schools, which includes the Paul Bunyan's Axe football game, the rivalry series is between two of the most successful in collegiate hockey. Including results from both men's and woman's play, the programs have combined for 23 NCAA titles and 59 Frozen Four appearances over their histories. The men's programs compete in the Big Ten Conference, while the women's programs have resided in the Western Collegiate Hockey Association (WCHA) since the National Collegiate Athletic Association first began to sponsor the sport for women.

Men's ice hockey

Series history 

The rivalry has its origins in informal play beginning in 1922, before halting 12 years later. The rivalry was revived in 1965 with Wisconsin resuming its sponsoring of the sport. In the 1981 season, the teams met for their first and only matchups to-date for the national championship. After three periods, the Badgers topped the Gophers by a score of 6 to 3 under head coach Bob Johnson. After competing together in the Western Collegiate Hockey Association since 1999, both teams moved to their all-sports home, the Big Ten Conference, in anticipation of the 2013–14 season as part of widespread NCAA realignment in hockey. While questions surrounded the continuation of many of the rivals' other historic series, such as North Dakota and Minnesota Duluth, their rivalry with each other continued uninterrupted. As of the end of the 2020–21 season, Minnesota leads the series 176–99–24.

Rival accomplishments 
The following summarizes the accomplishments of the two programs.

Wisconsin vacated results from the 1992 NCAA tournament

Game results

Women's ice hockey

Series history 

Since women's ice hockey became an NCAA sport, the two have been the flagpole programs, with frequent Top-5 meetings and matchups in the NCAA tournament and three national championships. The rivalry is fueled by the local nature of its players; in 2019, 24 players on the two rosters hailed from either Minnesota or Wisconsin. After the Gophers prevailed in the 2019 national title, the last four matchups featured No. 1 versus No. 2. The most recent matchups featured #2 Minnesota visiting the top-ranked Badgers, as Wisconsin took both of the two game set. As of the end of the 2020–21 season, Minnesota leads the series 53–44–13.

Rival accomplishments 
The following summarizes the accomplishments of the two programs.

Game results

References

College ice hockey rivalries in the United States
Minnesota Golden Gophers men's ice hockey
Minnesota Golden Gophers women's ice hockey
Wisconsin Badgers men's ice hockey
Wisconsin Badgers women's ice hockey